3rei Sud Est (also spelled 3 Sud Est or 3SE, styled forms of Trei Sud-Est) is a dance music group from Romania.  The group was formed in 1997. The acronym translates in English by "Three South-East", because the band had three youths from Constanta, which is in the South-Eastern part of Romania. The first single stayed a full year on the Romanian charts.

In 2001 the Rai Uno Uno mattina TV show hosted by Cristiano Malgioglio has invited and presented the stage group as the most successful band in Romania. He based his statement on the awards the group had won: the Bravo Otto Award 2000, the Black Sea Shore Mamaia Singing Festival 1999 and 2000 awards, and the Romanian music industry award.

Singles
De-ar vorbi inima (2022, versuri)
Jumătatea mea mai bună feat. Andra (2021)  Airplay 100= peak 1
Valuri (2020)
Prietenia (2019)
Focul (2019)
Dansăm în ploaie (2018)
Stele (2017)
Am dat tot (2017)
Cine ești (2016)
Adio (2016)
Tic Tac (2015)
Mai stai (feat. INNA) (2015)
Liberi (2014)
Emoții (2014)  Airplay 100= peak 1
Vorbe care dor (2007)  Romanian Top 100= peak 1
N-ai crezut în mine (2007)
Iubire (2006)
Oh Baby (2006)
Alături de îngeri (2005)
Cu capu-n nori (2005)
Se așterne toamna (2003)
Poveste de dragoste (2003)
Clipe feat. Adela Popescu (2003)  Romanian Top 100= peak 1
De dorul tău (2002)
Când soarele răsare (2002)
N-ai avut curaj (2001)
Te voi pierde (2001)  Romanian Top 100= peak 1
Remember me (2001)
Te aștept să vii (2000)  Romanian Top 100= peak 1
Vreau să te uit (2000)
Te plac (1999)
Amintirile (1999)  Romanian Top 100= peak 1
Tu ești vinovat (1999)
Prima dragoste la mare (feat. Claudia) (1999)
De câte ori (1998)
Ai plecat (1997)
3rei Sud Est (1997)

Discography

Epic (2018) 
01.  Stele
02.  Epic
03.  Dansăm în ploaie
04.  Doar una
05.  Cine ești?
06.  Liberi
07.  Emoții
08.  Mai Stai (feat. Inna) 
09.  Am dat tot
10.  Tic Tac
11.  Adio

Iubire (2007) 
01. Iubire 3:21
02. Don't say I love you 3:46
03. Miracle 3:24
04. N-ai crezut în mine 3:23
05. Mă iubeai 3:21
06. Cuore 3:54
07. Oh baby 3:21
08. Parte din mine (electronic love) 3:43
09. Mă doare 3:34
10. Rock my soul

Cu capu-n nori (2005)
01. Cu capu-n nori 3:22
02. M-am îndrăgostit 3:51
03. Doar tu 3:51
04. Ieri și azi 3:37
05. Fără ea 3:50
06. Alături de îngeri 3:37
07. Marea 3:02
08. Nu te las sa pleci 3:24
09. Toata lumea 3:09
10. Cu capu-n nori (extended version) 5:08

Symbol (2003)
01. Clipe (slow version) 3:42
02. Cât te-am iubit 3:51
03. Poveste de dragoste 3:10
04. Se așterne toamna 3:38
05. Clipe (dance version) 4:00
06. O altă zi în paradis 3:34
08. Cât te-am iubit (extended version) 6:36
09. Clipe (extended version)

Top (2002)
01. De dorul tău 3:37
02. Va fi prea târziu 3:27
03. Poți 3:42
04. Regrete 3:32
05. La capăt de drum 3:45
06. De dorul tău (extended version)
07. Va fi prea târziu (extended version) 4:13

Sentimental (2001)
01. Tu n-ai avut curaj 4:08
02. Da-mi o șansă 4:03
03. Arăți perfect 3:59
04. Departe de tine 4:18
05. Când soarele răsare 3:30
06. Te voi pierde 4:29
07. Departe de tine (remix) 3:54
08. Te voi pierde (remix) 4:17
09. Tu n-ai avut curaj (extended version) 4:58
10. Da-mi o șansă (extended version) 5:05
11. Arăți perfect (extended version) 4:53

Îmi plac ochii tăi (2000)
01. Vreau sa te uit 4:02
02. De ziua ta 4:00
03. Îmi plac ochii tăi 3:27
04. Vreau să-mi trăiesc viața 3:21
05. Vreau să te uit (extended version) 5:45
06. Vreau să te uit (instrumental)
07. Îmi plac ochii tăi (extended version) 4:34

Mileniul III (1999)
01. Amintirile 3:57
02. Te plac 3:35
03. Nu mai vreau să te cred (Latino mix) 4:00
04. Te-aștept să vii 3:37
05. Amintirile (remix 2k) 3:59
06. Te plac (extended version) 5:47
07. Amintirile (instrumental)
08. Te-aștept să vii (extended version) 5:58

Visul meu (1999)
01. Prima dragoste la mare feat. AndreEa 3:24
02. Tu ești vinovat 3:47
03. În seara asta ne distrăm 3:27
04. Nu mai vreau să te cred 3:55
05. Vei fi doar a mea
06. Am crezut (live) 3:21
07. Petrecem în cartier 3:20
08. Mi-e dor 3:35
09. Visul meu 4:52
10. Hai, spune-mi ! 3:25
11. De câte ori 3:31
12. Prima dragoste la mare (Latino house mix)

3 Sud Est (1998)
01. 3 Sud Est 3:45
02. Ai plecat 3:35
03. Vino lângă mine (feat. Gabriela) 3:33
04. Te chem acum 3:28
05. Crede-ma 3:52
06. Te vreau în viata mea 3:27
07. Lory 3:55
08. Nu te mai iubesc 3:23
09. Nu ma uita 3:46
10. Viata de turneu 3:22

CD-Extended plays

Te voi pierde (2001)
01. Te voi pierde (radio edit)
02. Remember me
03. Te voi pierde (extended version)
04. I ricordi

3rei Sud Est Mix (1998)
This title has been released in two different versions.
01. De câte ori
02. 3rei Sud Est (yep, yep)
03. 3rei Sud Est (DJ Phantom Club Mix)
04. Vino lângă mine (nostalgic mix)
05. De câte ori (instrumental)
06. Ai plecat (remix)

Compilations

Best of 3SE 1997-2007
01. Vorbe care dor 3:50
02. Ai plecat 3:39
03. 3SE 3:47
04. Amintirile 4:01
05. Te plac 3:36
06. Vreau să te uit 4:02
07. De ziua ta 4:05
08. Te aștept sa vii 3:42
09. Te voi pierde 4:30
10. Când soarele răsare 3:34
11. De dorul tău 3:40
12. La capăt de drum 3:47
13. Clipe 3:39
14. Poveste de dragoste 3:10
15. Se-așterne toamna 3:40
16. Cu capu-n nori 3:22
17. Alături de îngeri 3:37
18. Iubire 3:21
19. N-ai crezut în mine 3:23

3 Sud Est prezinta "Starurile dance va colinda" (2001)
Is a compilation of various Romanian singers Christmas collection of songs.
01. 3 Sud Est - O, ce veste minunată ! 3:08
02. Minodora - Linu-i lin
03. Blondy - Florile dalbe
04. N&D - Fără tine de Crăciun
05. 3 Sud Est - Mos Crăciun 3:16
06. Sweet Kiss - Miracol
07. Alina - Ninge
08. George Călin - Jingle bells

Other
3 Sud Est book (2000)

Video DVD : Best Of (2007)
01. Amintirile 3:58
02. Te plac 3:22
03. Vreau să te uit 4:00
04. Te aștept să vii 3:40
05. Te voi pierde 4:39
06. Când soarele răsare 3:20
07. N-ai avut curaj 4:09
08. De dorul tău 3:40
09. Clipe 3:34
10. Poveste de dragoste 3:07
11. Se-așterne toamna 3:54
12. Cu capu-n nori 3:30
13. Alături de îngeri 3:37
14. Iubire 3:20
15. N-ai crezut în mine 3:24

References

External links
 3rei Sud Est Official website
 3rei Sud Est Official forum
 biography

Romanian dance musical groups
Musical trios
Romanian pop music groups
Musical groups established in 1997
Musical groups reestablished in 2014
Musical groups disestablished in 2008